Horace Gifford (August 7, 1932 – April 6, 1992) was a celebrated beach house architect of the sixties, seventies, and early eighties. He grew up in Florida, where his family had developed the town of Vero Beach. Although Gifford never finished his formal architectural education—and therefore relied on licensed peers to stamp and sign off on his work—he led the Modernist transformation of New York's Fire Island, largely in its gay communities. Across this popular, car-free barrier island, off the southern coast of Long Island, he produced 63 homes, with 15 others further afield. 

Long before green building came into vogue, his houses were lessons in sustainable design. Generally modest in size and wrought in exposed cedar with glass, they were artfully wedded to their sites. He rejected not only the traditional New England styles of Cape Cod and Martha’s Vineyard, but also the sprawling, grandiose language of the mansions of The Hamptons. At the same time, decisively veering away from the architectural lexicon of 1950s suburbia—with its exterior paint, tidy lawns and fences—Gifford’s designs often had zigzagging entry paths, weaving amid natural beach grasses, stones, and sandy terrain. He convinced most of his clients to build houses not much bigger than 1,000 square feet, on average. Weathered over time, the cedar cladding blended with the landscape, while such features as shady overhangs and breezeways allowed for climatic comfort with natural airflow across the living spaces. Favoring open floor plans, he tended to design the living, dining, and kitchen areas as one large, continuous space. He kept closets to a minimum—and usually without doors—perhaps alluding to the closeted lives of many gay people at the time. Despite the modest square-footage, however, his houses—often for well-to-do figures with expansive personalities—had their own dramatic gestures, many with soaring ceilings, even in small rooms, and interiors that jutted out, over the sand dunes. 

Gifford died in 1992 of complications from AIDS. Though critically praised and published during his lifetime, he was later nearly forgotten, until 2013, when architect and historian Christopher Rawlins published Fire Island Modernist: Horace Gifford and the Architecture of Seduction. The book combines the genres of monograph, biography, and social history to reveal the operatic arc of Gifford's life and times:

Although Gifford died in 1992, his career beyond the gay community effectively ended in the 1970s after he was outed for his sexual orientation.

References

The quotes from Paul Goldberger and Alan Hess appear as blurbs on the jacket of Fire Island Modernist: Horace Gifford and the Architecture of Seduction.

External links

1932 births
1992 deaths
20th-century American architects
People from Vero Beach, Florida
AIDS-related deaths in Texas